The Journal of the Association for Information Systems (JAIS) is a top-tier peer-reviewed scientific journal that covers research in the areas of information systems and technology. It is an official journal of the Association for Information Systems and published electronically. The journal was established in 2000 and is abstracted and indexed in Science Citation Index Expanded, Social Sciences Citation Index, and Current Contents/Social & Behavioral Sciences. According to the Journal Citation Reports, the journal has a 2018 impact factor of 3.103.

Editors-in-chief 
The following persons have been editors-in-chief of the journal:
Phillip Ein-Dor, Tel Aviv University (2000-2002)
Sirkka Jarvenpaa, University of Texas at Austin (2002-2005)
Kalle Lyytinen, Case Western Reserve University (2005-2010)
Shirley Gregor, Australian National University (2010-2013)
Suprateek Sarker, University of Virginia (2013–2019)
Dorothy Leidner, Baylor University (2019-present)

References

External links 
 

Association for Information Systems academic journals
Publications established in 2000
Information systems journals
English-language journals
Monthly journals